Ju Sigyeong (December 22, 1876 – July 27, 1914) was one of the founders of modern Korean linguistics. He was born in Pongsan-gun, Hwanghae-do in 1876. He helped to standardize the Korean language, based on the spelling and grammar of vernacular Korean.

Biography
Ju Sigyeong was born in Hwanghae Province, in what is now North Korea. He studied Classical Chinese from an early age. In 1887 he moved to Seoul and studied linguistics. In 1896 he found work in the first Hangeul-only newspaper, Dongnip Sinmun, founded by the Korean independence activist Seo Jae-pil. In 1897 Seo Jae-pil was sent into exile to the United States, and Ju Sigyeong left the newspaper.

Interested in Western linguistics and teaching methods, Ju Sigyeong served as a Korean instructor for the American missionary William B. Scranton, founder of today's Ewha Womans University.

Standardizing Korean Language
Having realized the need of a standardized Korean alphabet, Ju Sigyeong established the Korean Language System Society in 1886 along with several of his colleagues. He hosted several seminars in the National Language Discussion Centre of the Sangdong Youth Academy of the Korean language.

He proposed that the  Korean parts of speech include nouns, verbs, adjectives, adverbs,  unconjugated adjectives, auxiliaries, conjunctions, exclamations, and sentence-final particles. Ju Sigyeong coined the name Hangul between 1910 and 1913 to identify the Korean writing system, which had previously existed under several other names, such as eonmun (vernacular script), since the 15th century.

In his 1914 publication, Sounds of the Language, he promoted writing Hangul linearly rather than syllabically. This is one of his few proposals not to have been implemented in modern Korean linguistics, although there have been experiments with linear Hangul, most notably in Primorsky Krai.

Publications 
 The History of the Downfall of Vietnam (1907)
 The National Language Classical Phonetics  (1908) (based on his lecture notes)
 An Introduction to the Chinese Language  (1909)
 An Introduction to the National Language  (1910)
 The Grammar of the National Language (1910)
 Sounds of the Language (1914)

See also
 Hangul
 Korean language
 South Korean standard language
 North Korean standard language

References

External links 
 주시경 (Ju Si-kyeong)  a biography with a photo

1876 births
1914 deaths
History of Korea
South Korean Protestants
Converts to Christianity
Sangju Ju clan
People from North Hwanghae
Linguists from Korea
20th-century linguists
Linguists of Korean